Josephine is Magnolia Electric Co.'s third and final studio album, and the first after Fading Trails in 2006. For the album, the band teamed up once again with engineer Steve Albini at his Electrical Audio Studios in Chicago. The record was conceived as a tribute to late Magnolia Electric Co. bass guitarist Evan Farrell. The album took two weeks to write and record.

Track listing

References

External links 
 Secretly Canadian press release
 Recording Josephine (2009) - Magnolia Electric Company at Electrical Audio, a 70-minute documentary

2009 albums
Jason Molina albums
Albums produced by Steve Albini
Secretly Canadian albums